The 2015–16 Guam Soccer League (Budweiser Soccer League for sponsorship reasons) is the 27th season of Guam Soccer League, Guam's First tier professional football league. Rovers are the defending champions.

League table

References

Guam Soccer League seasons
Guam